Alexa Guarachi and Erin Routliffe were the defending champions, but both players chose not to participate.

Sharon Fichman and Maria Sanchez won the title after defeating Maja Chwalińska and Elitsa Kostova 6–0, 6–4 in the final.

Seeds

Draw

Draw

References
Main Draw

Tevlin Women's Challenger - Doubles